Klottey Korle is one of the constituencies represented in the Parliament of Ghana. It elects one Member of Parliament (MP) by the first-past-the-post system of election. The Klottey Korle constituency is located in the Greater Accra Region of Ghana.

The current Member of Parliament for the Klottey Korle Constituency is Dr. Zanetor Agyeman-Rawlings.

Members of Parliament

Elections

See also
List of Ghana Parliament constituencies

References 

Parliamentary constituencies in the Greater Accra Region